HMS Dreadnought was an ironclad turret ship built for the Royal Navy during the 1870s. Construction was halted less than a year after it began and she was redesigned to improve her stability and buoyancy. Upon completion in 1879, the ship was placed in reserve until she was commissioned in 1884 for service with the Mediterranean Fleet. Upon her return 10 years later, she became a coast guard ship in Ireland for two years. The ship then became a depot ship in 1897 before she was reclassified as a second-class battleship in 1900. Dreadnought participated in the annual fleet manoeuvres for the next two years before she became a training ship in 1902. The ship was taken out of service three years later and sold for scrap in 1908.

Background and design
Dreadnought was originally named Fury and was designed by the Director of Naval Construction (DNC), Sir Edward Reed, as an improved and enlarged version of the preceding  turret ships. The ship was laid down, fully framed and partially plated up to the bottom of the waterline belt armour when work was ordered stopped in 1871 in light of the loss of the ironclad turret ship  in a heavy storm the previous year. A Committee on Designs was formed in January 1871 to evaluate existing ship designs with special consideration as to their stability and buoyancy and found that the designs of Devastation and Fury were lacking in both qualities and needed to be modified. Reed had resigned before Captain was lost and he vehemently opposed the changes made by the new DNC, Nathaniel Barnaby and his assistant, William White, himself a future DNC.

This increased the ship's freeboard amidships which improved buoyancy and stability and provided additional, badly needed accommodation for the crew. Barnaby and White's initial plan was to extend the breastwork fore and aft, almost to the ends of the ship, but this was changed to run all the way to the ends after the results of 's sea trials in 1873–74 revealed that her low bow caused major problems in head seas. Other changes was the substitution of more economical inverted vertical compound-expansion steam engines for Reed's original horizontal, low-pressure engines, more powerful  guns for the  ones first chosen, and the fitting of hydraulic pumps to work the gun turrets.

Description

The ship displaced . Dreadnought was the first ship to have a longitudinal watertight bulkhead that divided the engine and boiler rooms down the centreline. Her crew consisted of 369 officers and ratings. She proved to be a very steady ship with minimal rolling, although she was very wet as high seas usually swept her deck from end to end.

The ship was the first large ironclad to have two 3-cylinder inverted vertical compound-expansion steam engines. These were built by Humphry & Tennant and each drove a single four-bladed,  propeller.

Dreadnought was originally intended to be equipped with a pair of RML 12-inch rifled muzzle-loading guns in each turret, but these were replaced by RML 12.5-inch guns while the ship was being redesigned. The gun turrets were rotated by steam power and loaded by hydraulic power.

The  armoured citadel protected the bases of the gun turrets, the funnel uptakes and the crew's quarters. The turrets were protected by two  plates, each backed by wood. The aft 13-inch bulkhead of the original design was retained, but the forward one was made redundant by the forward extension of the belt.

Construction and career

Dreadnought, the fifth ship of her name to serve in the Royal Navy, was laid down on 10 September 1870 at No. 2 Slip, Pembroke Dockyard, Wales with the name of Fury. Construction was subsequently halted for a time in 1871 to redesign the ship and she was  renamed Dreadnought on 1 February 1875. The renamed ship was launched on 8 March by Mrs. Agnes Wood, daughter of William Courtenay, 11th Earl of Devon. She was completed on 15 February 1879 at a cost of £619,739.

The ship was then immediately placed in reserve until 1884 when she was commissioned for service with the Mediterranean Fleet. Dreadnought was fitted with ten 1-inch (25 mm) Nordenfelt guns on the hurricane deck when she was commissioned. The ship sailed for the Mediterranean Sea on 14 October and remained there for the next decade. The future King George V served aboard in 1886–88. She returned to British waters in September 1894 and began a refit at Chatham Dockyard that included the replacement of her Nordenfelt guns with six quick-firing (QF) 6-pounder  and ten QF 3-pounder  Hotchkiss guns. Dreadnought became a coast guard ship at Bantry Bay, Ireland in March 1895.

Two years later, in March 1897, she was relieved of that duty and became a depot ship in July at Devonport. The ship was reboilered and had more QF guns installed in 1898. Dreadnought was reclassified as a second-class battleship in 1900 and took part in British fleet manoeuvres in that year and the following one. In June 1902, she was refitted at Chatham to serve as a tender to HMS Defiance, torpedo school ship at Devonport, and later as a depot ship. She took part in the fleet review held at Spithead on 16 August 1902 for the coronation of King Edward VII, and was commissioned as tender four days later, on 20 August 1902. Lieutenant Harry Louis d′Estoteville Skipwith was appointed in command in October 1902. She was taken out of service and transferred to the Kyles of Bute in 1905. The ship was sold to Thos. W. Ward for scrap for £23,000 on 14 July 1908 and was broken up by February 1909.

Footnotes

References

External links

 Battleships-Cruisers.co.uk Photo Gallery

 

Battleships of the Royal Navy
Ships built in Pembroke Dock
1875 ships
Victorian-era battleships of the United Kingdom